= Asia-Pacific Social Science Review =

- Discipline: Social sciences
- Language: English
- Edited by: Ador Torneo

Publication details
- Publisher: De La Salle University Publishing House

Standard abbreviations
- ISO 4: Asia-Pac. Soc. Sci. Rev.

Indexing
- ISSN: 0119-8386 (print); 2350-8329 (web)

Links
- Journal homepage

Asia-Pacific Social Science Review (APSSR) is a biannually peer-reviewed academic journal published by De La Salle University, Manila, Philippines, covering political sciences and related disciplines. It receives research articles and research notes on topics situated in or with implications for the Asia-Pacific region. It is abstracted and indexed by Scopus, the ASEAN Citation Index, and EBSCO.
